Pierre Pranchère (born 1 July 1927) is a French politician and farmer.

He is a member of the French Communist Party (PCF), and served as  deputy of France in 1956 and 1958. He sat on the PCF Central Committee from 1964 to 1985. He was re-elected deputy of the first constituency of Corrèze in 1973. He was also a member of the general council of Corrèze, elected in the Canton of La Roche-Canillac. He already a member of the young underground communists since 1943.He also elected deputy of the I and II legislatures.

Biography
Pierre Pranchère was born in Brive-la-Gaillarde, France on 1927. Pierre Pranchère works with his farming parents. He is the general secretary of the Maquis de Corrèze collective.

References 

1927 births
Living people
French Communist Party politicians
20th-century French politicians
21st-century French politicians